

Gmina Szprotawa is an urban-rural gmina (administrative district) in Żagań County, Lubusz Voivodeship, in western Poland.

Villages
Apart from the town of Szprotawa, Gmina Szprotawa contains the villages and settlements of Biernatów, Bobrowice, Borowina, Buczek, Cieciszów, Długie, Dziećmiarowice, Dzikowice, Henryków, Kartowice, Leszno Dolne, Leszno Górne, Nowa Kopernia, Pasterzowice, Siecieborzyce, Sieraków, Wiechlice and Witków.

Neighbouring gminas
Gmina Szprotawa is bordered by the gminas of Bolesławiec, Gromadka, Kożuchów, Małomice, Niegosławice, Nowe Miasteczko, Osiecznica, Przemków and Żagań.

Twin towns – sister cities

Gmina Szprotawa is twinned with:
 Gevelsberg, Germany
 Spremberg, Germany
 Uman, Ukraine

References

Szprotawa
Żagań County